Puffin Island virus, is a strain of Dugbe orthonairovirus belonging to the Hughes serogroup.

References

Nairoviridae
Infraspecific virus taxa